The 1932 Ball State Cardinals football team was an American football team that represented Ball State Teachers College (later renamed Ball State University) in the Indiana Intercollegiate Conference (IIC) during the 1932 college football season. In their third season under head coach Lawrence McPhee, the Cardinals compiled a 4–4 record (overall and in conference), finished in ninth place out of 14 teams in the IIC, and outscored opponents by a total of 102 to 90. The team played its home games at Ball State Field in Muncie, Indiana.

Schedule

References

Ball State
Ball State Cardinals football seasons
Ball State Cardinals football